The Athletics at the 2016 Summer Paralympics – Women's 1500 metres T54 event at the 2016 Paralympic Games took place on 13 September 2016, at the Estádio Olímpico João Havelange.

Heats

Heat 1 
18:19 12 September 2016:

Heat 2 
18:27 12 September 2016:

Final 
18:14 13 September 2016:

Notes

Athletics at the 2016 Summer Paralympics